George Salmon FBA FRS FRSE (25 September 1819 – 22 January 1904) was a distinguished and influential Irish mathematician and Anglican theologian. After working in algebraic geometry for two decades, Salmon devoted the last forty years of his life to theology. His entire career was spent at Trinity College Dublin.

Personal life
Salmon was born in Dublin, to Michael Salmon and Helen Weekes (the daughter of the Reverend Edward Weekes), but he spent his boyhood in Cork City, where his father Michael was a linen merchant. He attended Hamblin and Porter's School there before starting at Trinity College in 1833.

In 1837 he won a scholarship and graduated from Trinity in 1839 with first-class honours in mathematics. In 1841 at the age of 21, he attained a paid fellowship and teaching position in mathematics at Trinity. In 1845 he was additionally appointed to a position in theology at the university, after having been ordained a deacon in 1844 and a priest in the Church of Ireland in 1845.

He remained at Trinity for the rest of his career.

He died at the Provost's House on 22 January 1904 and was buried in Mount Jerome Cemetery, Dublin. He was an avid reader throughout his life, and his obituary refers to him as "specially devoted to the novels of Jane Austen."

Family

In 1844 he married Frances Anne Salvador, daughter of Rev J L Salvador of Staunton-upon-Wye in Herefordshire, with whom he had six children, of which only two survived him.

Mathematics
In the late 1840s and the 1850s Salmon was in regular and frequent communication with Arthur Cayley and J. J. Sylvester. The three of them, together with a small number of other mathematicians (including Charles Hermite), were developing a system for dealing with n-dimensional algebra and geometry. During this period Salmon published about 36 papers in journals. In these papers for the most part he solved narrowly defined, concrete problems in algebraic geometry, as opposed to more broadly systematic or foundational questions. But he was an early adopter of the foundational innovations of Cayley and the others. In 1859 he published the book Lessons Introductory to the Modern Higher Algebra (where the word "higher" means n-dimensional). This was for a while simultaneously the state-of-the-art and the standard presentation of the subject, and went through updated and expanded editions in 1866, 1876 and 1885, and was translated into German and French.

From 1858 to 1867 he was the Donegall Lecturer in Mathematics at Trinity.

Meanwhile, back in 1848 Salmon had published an undergraduate textbook entitled A Treatise on Conic Sections. This text remained in print for over fifty years, going through five updated editions in English, and was translated into German, French and Italian. Salmon himself did not participate in the expansions and updates of the more later editions. The German version, which was a "free adaptation" by Wilhelm Fiedler, was popular as an undergraduate text in Germany. Salmon also published two other mathematics texts, A Treatise on Higher Plane Curves (1852) and A Treatise on the Analytic Geometry of Three Dimensions (1862). These too were in print for a long time and went through a number of later editions, with Salmon delegating the work of the later editions to others.

In 1858 he was presented with the Cunningham Medal of the Royal Irish Academy. In June 1863 he was elected a Fellow of the Royal Society followed in 1868 by the award of their Royal Medal "For his researches in analytical geometry and the theory of surfaces". In 1889 Salmon received the Copley Medal of the society, the highest honorary award in British science, but by then he had long since lost his interest in mathematics and science.

Salmon received honorary degrees from several universities, including that of Doctor mathematicae (honoris causa) from the Royal Frederick University on 6 September 1902, when they celebrated the centennial of the birth of mathematician Niels Henrik Abel.

 is named in honor of George Salmon.

Theology
From the early 1860s onward Salmon was primarily occupied with theology. In 1866 he was appointed Regius Professor of Divinity at TCD, at which point he resigned from his position in the mathematics department at TCD. In 1871 he accepted an additional post of chancellor of St. Patrick's Cathedral, Dublin.

One of his early publications in theology was in 1853 as a contributor to a book of rebuttals to the Tracts for the Times. Arguments against Roman Catholicism were a recurring theme in Salmon's theology and culminated in his widely read 1888 book Infallibility of the Church in which he argued that certain beliefs of the Roman church were absurd, especially the beliefs in the infallibility of the church and the infallibility of the pope. Salmon also wrote books about eternal punishment, miracles, and interpretation of the New Testament. His book An Historical Introduction to the Study of the Books of the New Testament, which was widely read, is an account of the reception and interpretation of the gospels in the early centuries of Christianity as seen through the writings of leaders such as Irenaeus and Eusebius.

Chess
Salmon was a keen chess player. He was a patron to the University Chess Club, and was also the President of Dublin Chess Club from 1890–1903. He participated in the second British Chess Congress and had the honour of playing the chess prodigy Paul Morphy in Birmingham, England, on 27 August 1858.  He beat Daniel Harrwitz in an interesting game.

Even in his book Infallibility of the Church, Salmon mentions chess a few times:  
He argues that the doctrine of papal infallibility is vitally important for opponents of Catholicism to refute; otherwise all other arguments would be of little importance, as when a chessplayer wins many pieces but his king is checkmated.
In another chess reference Salmon said that if one met someone who says that he has never been beaten, this player could be given rook odds. Thus "the delusion of invincibility can never grow up in the mind of anyone except one who has never met a strong antagonist."
Salmon said that if one played someone who would normally receive queen odds, then one would go easy and not be too strict, e.g. allowing take-backs. Thus he is so convinced that the Popes have erred that he is not threatened by acknowledging when they have been right.

Provost of Trinity College Dublin

Salmon was Provost of Trinity from 1888 until his death in 1904. The highlight of his career may have been when in 1892 he presided over the great celebrations marking the tercentenary of the College, which had been founded by Queen Elizabeth I.

Admission of women to Trinity
In 1870, Trinity had introduced the Examinations for Women, following a request from Alexandra College. In 1880, while Humphrey Lloyd was provost, Samuel Haughton, Anthony Traill, John Jellett and others proposed that degrees be open to women, on the same terms as men. Lloyd, as provost, was not a supporter, and the motion was defeated. In 1881, Jellett became provost, and committee was set up in 1882 to investigate the matter, including future provosts Salmon and Trail, respectively opposing and supporting admission. Despite the support of the provost, the committee was not effective.

Salmon was provost during the campaign for admission by the Central Association of Irish Schoolmistresses (CAISM), in which Alice Oldham was an important figure. Salmon and the board were not generally receptive to the campaign. While Salmon was a conservative, his strong opposition to the admission of women cannot be dismissed simply; he had been a member of the council of Alexandra College, had supported girls competing on equal terms with boys in Intermediate examinations and his daughter, from the provost's house, had acted as coordinator for the Examinations for Women and was a member of CAISM. In 1896, all eight members of the board were over 70 years of age, but by 1901 retirements and deaths had resulted in the majority of the board being pro-admission.

In 1902, John Mahaffy proposed that the time had come to take action on the issue of awarding degrees to women. This was passed by the board, and, though the motion was opposed by Salmon, a committee was set up to report, and by the end of the year the board resolved that the Lord Lieutenant, William Ward should be petitioned to move the king to issue new Letters Patent for admission of Women. In 1903, Ward replied, indicating that the agreement of the provost was essential before Letters Patent would be issued. Salmon wrote withdrawing his formal objections in July 1903. The Letters Patten were received by the board on 16 January 1904. This was Salmon's last board meeting.

He is alleged to have said that women would only be admitted to Trinity as students over his dead body. Coincidentally, immediately after his death on 22 January 1904, Isabel Marion Weir Johnston became the first woman undergraduate to succeed in registering at Trinity, and by the end of year dozens of other women had done likewise. She recalled, "When I arrived in Dublin 1904, I was informed that he [Salmon] had died that day, and the examination had to be put off until after the funeral."

Death

Salmon continued to attend board meetings up to his death. At his death, Salmon had been a familiar figure in Trinity for over 62 years, and was held in affection even by those who disagreed with him. Both Trail and Mahaffy were eager to succeed Salmon as provost, and were lobbying to secure the position on the day of his death.  Just before his death, Salmon is said to have anticipated this in another apocryphal story. He dreamed that he was dead, and his funeral was processing across front square, followed by weeping Fellows and Scholars. His coffin was laid in the chapel, "and then", he said, "I sat up in my coffin, whereupon Mahaffy and Trail wept louder than ever".

Bibliography
 1848: A Treatise on Conic Sections, Third edition, 1855, Fourth edition, 1863 via Internet Archive
 1852: A Treatise on Higher Plane Curves: Intended as a sequel to a Treatise on Conic Sections, Third edition, 1879
 1859: Lessons Introductory to the Modern Higher Algebra 172 pages. 2nd edition (1866) 326 pages. 3rd edition, 1876 354 pages. 4th edition (1885) 360 pages (with some additions by Cathcart to the chapters on binary quantics). 5th edition (1964) 376 pages  (the contents of the 4th edition, together with some sections from the 2nd edition omitted in the 3rd and 4th editions).
 1862: A Treatise on the Analytic Geometry of Three Dimensions; 5th edition, 1915 via Internet Archive, Reviews:
 1864: The Eternity of Future Punishment
 1873: The Reign of Law
 1881: Non-miraculous Christianity
 1885: Introduction to the New Testament
 1888: The Infallibility of the Church, Third edition, 1899
 1897: Some Thoughts on the Textual Criticism of the New Testament via Internet Archive

See also
Cubic surface
Glossary of invariant theory
Quaternary cubic
Ternary quartic
Salmon points

References

Further reading
 C. J. Joly (1905) "George Salmon 1819 — 1904", Proceedings of the Royal Society 75:347–55.

External links

 
 Sarah Nesbitt (2005) George Salmon: from Mathematics to Theology  from University of Saint Andrews.
 G. Salmon (1879) Treatise on Conic Sections, link from University of Michigan Historical Math Collection.
 Salmon's Tracts from Evangelical Tracts
 Rod Gow (1997) George Salmon: His Mathematical Work and Influence from Bulletin of the Irish Mathematical Society.
 

1819 births
1904 deaths
Alumni of Trinity College Dublin
Burials at Mount Jerome Cemetery and Crematorium
Donegall Lecturers of Mathematics at Trinity College Dublin
Fellows of the British Academy
Fellows of the Royal Society
Fellows of Trinity College Dublin
Irish mathematicians
Irish chess players
Irish Anglican theologians
People from County Cork
Provosts of Trinity College Dublin
Recipients of the Copley Medal
Regius Professors of Divinity (University of Dublin)
Royal Medal winners
Scholars of Trinity College Dublin
19th-century Irish mathematicians
19th-century chess players